204 (two hundred [and] four) is the natural number following 203 and preceding 205.

In mathematics
204 is a refactorable number. 204 is a square pyramidal number: 204 balls may be stacked in a pyramid whose base is an 8 × 8 square. Its square, 2042 = 41616, is the fourth square triangular number. As a figurate number, 204 is also a nonagonal number and a truncated triangular pyramid number. 204 is a member of the Mian-Chowla sequence.

There are exactly 204 irreducible quintic polynomials over a four-element field, exactly 204 ways to place three non-attacking chess queens on a 5 × 5 board, exactly 204 squares of an infinite chess move that are eight knight's moves from the center, exactly 204 strings of length 11 over a three-letter alphabet with no consecutively-repeated substring, and exactly 204 ways of immersing an oriented circle into the oriented plane so that it has four double points.

Both 204 and its square are sums of a pair of twin primes: 204 = 101 + 103 and 2042 = 41616 = 20807 + 20809. The only smaller numbers with the same property are 12 and 84.

204 is a sum of all the perfect squares from 1 to 64 (i.e. 12 + 22 + 32 + 42 + 52 + 62 + 72 + 82 = 204).

In other fields
 In telecommunications, area code 204 is a North American telephone area code for the Canadian province of Manitoba. 204 is one of the original 86 area codes assigned in 1947 in the contiguous United States and the then-nine-province extent of Canada. More recently a second area code (431) was added to allow for the expanding phone number distribution within the province.
 204 is the HTTP status code indicating the request was successfully fulfilled and that there is no additional content to send in the response payload body.
 In a poker deck with a single wild joker, there are 204 hands that are at least as good as a straight flush.
Model 204 is a database management system.

References

Integers